Asadabad-e Vosta (also Romanized as Asadābād-e Vostá) is a village in Firuzabad Rural District, Firuzabad District, Selseleh County, Lorestan Province, Iran. At the 2006 census, its population was 62, in 16 families.

References 

Towns and villages in Selseleh County